Colchester United Football Club is an English football club based in Colchester, Essex. Formed in 1937, the club competed in the Southern Football League from their foundation until 1950, when they were elected to the Football League. The club spent eleven years in the Third Division South and Third Division following the league's reorganisation in 1958, with a best finish of third place in 1957, one point behind rivals Ipswich Town and Torquay United. Colchester suffered their first relegation in 1961 as they finished 23rd in the Third Division, but spent just one season in the Fourth Division as they were promoted in second position, behind Millwall by just one point. This trend of relegation followed by promotion continued over the next few decades, before the club were eventually relegated from the Football League to the Conference in 1990.

Player-manager Roy McDonough guided the club back to the Football League in 1992, winning the non-league double of the Conference title and the FA Trophy. The club then won promotion to the Second Division in 1998 with a 1–0 Third Division play-off Final win at Wembley against Torquay United. The club were again promoted in the 2005–06 season under the stewardship of Phil Parkinson, gaining the opportunity to play second tier football for the first time in their history. After two seasons in the Championship, Colchester were relegated back to League One. Colchester were relegated to the fourth tier for the first time in 18-years at the end of the 2015–16 season.

Colchester United's first team have competed in a number of professional competitions, and all players who have played between 25 and 99 of these matches, either as a member of the starting line-up or as a substitute, are listed below. Each player's details include the duration of his Colchester United career, his usual playing position while employed by the club, the number of matches started, the number of substitute appearances and total number of appearances, their total goals scored and total numbers of yellow and red cards collected. The players are sorted by total number of appearances, then by number of starts, then by player name in alphabetical order.

Introduction
Over 200 players have made between 25 and 99 appearances in all competitions for Colchester United. Richard Garcia is the only player to have made exactly 99 appearances during his Colchester United career. Five of the players featured on this list would either go on to manage the club or were player-manager. These include Syd Fieldus, Ted Fenton, Allan Hunter, Ian Atkins and Geraint Williams.

Five players who made between 25 and 99 Colchester United appearances have also been inducted into the club's Hall of Fame. All of these players were in the starting line-up when Colchester beat Leeds United 3–2 in the FA Cup fifth round in 1971, and were duly inducted into the Hall of Fame in 2009 alongside the six other players who played in that game. The five players include Ray Crawford, John Gilchrist, John Kurila, Brian Lewis and Dave Simmons.

Key
Player
Players highlighted in yellow are registered Colchester United players for the 2016–17 season.
Players marked in italics were on loan from another club for the duration of their Colchester United career. The loaning club(s) are noted in the reference column.

Position
Playing positions are listed according to the tactical formations that were employed at the time. The change in the names of defensive and midfield positions reflects the tactical evolution that occurred from the 1960s onwards.

Club career
Club career is defined as the first and last calendar years in which the player appeared for the club in any of the competitions listed below.

Total starts, Total subs, Total apps, Total goals, Total yellow cards and Total red cards
Total starts, total subs and total goals are matches a player has started, been brought on as a substitute and the combined total of these figures, the total number of goals scored, and the total number of yellow and red cards received in the following competitions; Southern League, Southern League Mid-Week Section, Southern League Cup, English Football League (including play-offs), Conference, FA Cup, EFL Cup, Associate Members' Cup/Football League Trophy/EFL Trophy, FA Trophy, Bob Lord Trophy and the Watney Cup.

Players with 25 to 99 appearances

Players with fewer than 25 or 100 or more appearances

References
General

Specific

Players
Colchester United F.C. players
Colchester United
Association football player non-biographical articles